Haga is a locality situated in Enköping Municipality, Uppsala County, Sweden with 257 inhabitants in 2010. Haga Castle, south of Enköping, is available for conferences, weddings or weekends away.

References 

Populated places in Uppsala County
Populated places in Enköping Municipality